Djafar Gacem (born 18 September 1966), sometimes as Djaâfar Gacem, is an Algerian director. He is best known as the director of popular television serials and films Nass Mlah City, Djemai Family, Sultan Achour 10 and Bouzid Days.

Personal life
He was born on September 18, 1966, in Algiers, Algeria.

Career

In 2001, he directed the television sitcom Nass Mlah City which first aired on Télévision Algérienne, Canal Algérie and A3 on November 6, 2002. The sitcoms enjoyed high ratings in Algeria in the 2000s. The series concluded in March 2006 after 119 episodes over three seasons. In 2006, he won the Award for Best Director at the Fennec d'or festivals for the series.

Following the success of the Nass Mlah City, he directed the next television series Djemai Family in 2008 which was awarded Best Director at the Fennec d'or Festival. Then in 2013, he made the series Dar El Bahdja and then Sultan Achour 10 in 2015. In 2019, he directed his first historical fiction feature film Héliopolis. The screening of the film had to be delayed due to the COVID-19 pandemic impact on the film industry in Algeria. The trailer was released on October 25, 2020, and was finally screened under strict health conditions on November 4, 2020. It was selected as the Algerian entry for the Best International Feature Film at the 93rd Academy Awards.

Filmography

References

External links
 

Living people
Algerian people
Algerian directors
1966 births
Algerian television people
Algerian film directors
Algerian filmmakers
People from Algiers
21st-century Algerian people